Gutterball may refer to:

"Gutterball", phrase used in American ten-pin bowling
Gutterballs (film), 2008 Canadian slasher film
Gutterballs, the name of a "film within a film" dream sequence in The Big Lebowski
"Gutter Ball," television series episode of General Hospital: Night Shift
Gutterball, 1990s band featuring Steve Wynn
Gutterball 3D and Gutterball 2 video (bowling) games released by Skunk Studios, the latter in 2004